Lichtenthal Abbey is a Cistercian nunnery in Lichtenthal in the town of Baden-Baden, Germany.

History and buildings
The abbey was founded in 1245 by Irmengard bei Rhein, widow of Margrave Hermann V of Baden, whose body she had brought here in 1248 from Backnang Abbey for re-burial. She seriously over-reached herself financially on the project, however, and was obliged to ask her family for help.

The imposing gateway, built in 1781, leads into a three-sided walled courtyard with a fountain dedicated to the Blessed Virgin Mary, surrounded by the various abbey and domestic buildings, the school, the abbey church, the Prince's Chapel and the hermit's chapel.

The Gothic abbey church, of which the choir dates from the 14th century and the nave from the 15th, contains works of art and furnishings of many dates, particularly of the 15th century, as at this time, on the initiative of the Abbess Margaret of Baden, the church interior was lavishly refurbished and ornamented.

The Prince's Chapel was built in 1288, and until 1372 was the burial place of the Margraves of Baden. Here is also the tomb of the foundress, Margravine Irmengard. Besides the tombs, the high altar and several side altars, this chapel also contains the statue of the "Madonna of the Keys", so called because in times of danger the abbey keys are entrusted to her. (The abbey has until now survived every danger unscathed, as is related in a Baden-Baden drinking song).

The three statues over the gateway are from the nearby ruined All Saints' Abbey and represent Saint Helena, above, Abbot Gerung, first abbot of All Saints, to the left, and his mother and the foundress of All Saints, the Duchess Uta of Schauenburg, to the right, who was a relative of the Margravine Irmengard.

The hermit's chapel, built in 1678, is used as a mortuary chapel for the nuns.

Present day
The abbey belongs to the Mehrerau Congregation. The present abbess is Mother Maria Bernadette Hein, the 46th abbess since its foundation. She succeeded Mother Adelgundis Selle in 2001.

The nuns particularly devote themselves to teaching - the nunnery accommodates the primary school of Lichtenthal - and to religious handicrafts.

Photo gallery

References and notes

External links 
  

Monasteries in Baden-Württemberg
Cistercian nunneries in Germany
1240s establishments in the Holy Roman Empire
1245 establishments in Europe
Burial sites of the House of Zähringen
13th-century Roman Catholic church buildings in Germany
Christian monasteries established in the 13th century